Marianne Halfdan-Nielsen (born 7 May 1956) is a Danish sailor. She competed in the women's 470 event at the 1992 Summer Olympics.

References

External links
 

1956 births
Living people
Danish female sailors (sport)
Olympic sailors of Denmark
Sailors at the 1992 Summer Olympics – 470
People from Lyngby-Taarbæk Municipality
Sportspeople from the Capital Region of Denmark